Dmitry Leonidovich Kuzelev (Дмитрий Леонидович Кузелев) (born 1 November 1969) is a Russian handball player.
 
He played for the Russia men's national handball team at the 2000 Summer Olympics in Sydney, where Russia won the gold medal.

In 2011, he won the Polish Championship with Orlen Wisła Płock.

References

External links

1969 births
Living people
Russian male handball players
Olympic handball players of Russia
Handball players at the 2000 Summer Olympics
Olympic gold medalists for Russia
Sportspeople from Kemerovo Oblast
Olympic medalists in handball
Medalists at the 2000 Summer Olympics